Live at Savoy, 1981 is a live album by American singer-songwriter Kim Carnes, recorded at the Savoy nightclub in New York on August 25, 1981 as part of her Mistaken Identity tour. The album was released in 1999 by King Biscuit Flower Hour Records, a label owned by the American radio program King Biscuit Flower Hour.

Background and release 
Live at Savoy was recorded during Carnes' promotional tour in support of Mistaken Identity (1981). The concert featured premiere performances of "Say You Don't Know Me" and "Thrill of the Grill" which appeared on her next album Voyeur (1982). Her live performance of "Still Hold On" was included as a bonus track on the 2001 reissue of Voyeur by One Way Records/EMI-Capitol Special Markets.

Critical reception 

Jason Ankeny of AllMusic rated the album two and a half out of five stars and stated that her performances "capture Carnes at the peak of her career".

In a contemporary review of the concert for The New York Times, Stephen Holden wrote that Carnes had an "effervescent stage presence" and "could hardly be a more fitting representative of the shifting sounds and attitudes of mainstream Los Angeles pop".

Track listing

Personnel
 Kim Carnes – lead vocals
 Steve Goldstein – keys
 Jerry Peterson – saxophone
 Josh Leo – guitar
 Craig Hull – guitar
 Bryan Garofalo – bass guitar
 Bill Cuomo – Prophet
 Craig Krampf – drums
 M. L. Benoit – percussion
 Daniel Moore – backing vocals
 David Ellingson – backing vocals

References 

Kim Carnes albums
1999 live albums